The 2017–18 Iowa Hawkeyes men's basketball team represented the University of Iowa in the 2017–18 NCAA Division I men's basketball season. The team was led by eighth-year head coach Fran McCaffery and played their home games at Carver–Hawkeye Arena as members of the Big Ten Conference. They finished the season 14–19, 4–14 in Big Ten play to finish in a three-way tie for 11th place. As the No. 12 seed in the Big Ten tournament, they defeated Illinois before losing to Michigan in the second round.

Previous season
The Hawkeyes finished the 2016–17 season with a record of 19–15, 10–8 in Big Ten play to finish in a four-way tie for fifth place. In the Big Ten tournament, as the 7th seed, Iowa was upset by 10th-seeded Indiana in the second round. Iowa was one of the First Four teams out of the NCAA tournament, which earned the team a No. 1 seed in the National Invitation Tournament. They defeated South Dakota in the first round before losing to eventual NIT champions TCU in overtime in the second round.

Offseason

Departures

2017 recruiting class

2018 Recruiting class

Roster

Schedule and results
The 2018 Big Ten tournament will be held at Madison Square Garden in New York City. Due to the Big East's use of that venue for their conference tournament, the Big Ten tournament will take place one week earlier than usual, ending the week before Selection Sunday. This could result in teams having nearly two weeks off before the NCAA tournament. As a result, it is anticipated that the Big Ten regular season will begin in mid-December. Coaches have requested that no Big Ten game be scheduled between Christmas and New Year's Day, accordingly each team will play two conference games in early December before finishing non-conference play. 

|-
!colspan=9 style=| European Tour

|-

|-

|-

|-
!colspan=9 style=| Exhibition 

|-

|-
!colspan=9 style=| Regular season

|-

|-

|-

|-

|-

|-

|-

|-

|-

|-

|-

|-

|-

|-

|-

|-

|-

|-

|-

|-

|-

|-

|-

|-

|-

|-

|-

|-

|-

|-

|-
!colspan=9 style=|Big Ten tournament

Source: Schedule

See also
2017–18 Iowa Hawkeyes women's basketball team

References

Iowa
Iowa Hawkeyes men's basketball seasons
Hawk
Hawk